Feel Good Together is the only studio album by indie rock band Drummer, released on September 29, 2009. It was released on band member Patrick Carney's label Audio Eagle Records.

Track listing
All songs written by Patrick Carney, Gregory Boyd, Steve Clements, Jon Finley and Jamie Stillman.
"Lottery Dust" – 3:21
"Feel Good Together" – 3:32
"Serious Encounters" – 4:43
"Mature Fantasy" – 4:19
"Every Nineteen Minutes" – 4:28
"Good Golly" – 3:29
"Connect to Lounge" – 4:31
"Buddy Scapes" – 3:32
"Diamonds to Shake" – 3:33
"Summer Control" – 3:31

Reception
The album was generally well received by critics. Rolling Stone gave the album 3 out of 5 stars, and Pitchfork Media gave the album 7.5 out of 10.

Personnel
 Gregory Boyd: Drums
 Patrick Carney: Bass
 Steve Clements: Organ, Moog, Background vocals
 Jon Finley: Vocals, guitar
 Jamie Stillman: Lead guitar
 Ben Vehorn: Engineering, Mixing
 Garrett Haines: Mastering

References

External links
MySpace page

2009 debut albums
Drummer (band) albums